Cerro Corá is a city and district and located in the Amambay Department of Paraguay on the Amambai Mountains. Its urban center has the name of Colonia Capitán Raúl Ocampos Rojas, also known as Chirigüelo. It has an area of 1451 km².

See also
Battle of Cerro Corá, 1870

References

Populated places in the Amambay Department
Districts of Paraguay